1. FC Lokomotive Leipzig's women team represented 1. FC Lokomotive Leipzig in the Frauen Bundesliga.

After spending five seasons in the 2. Frauen Bundesliga Lokomotive was the North group's runner-up in the 2010–11 season, second to Hamburger SV II. Since Hamburger II wasn't eligible for promotion as a reserve team, Lokomotive was instead promoted, reaching the Frauen Bundesliga for the first time in its history.

In 2013 Lok's women's football department collectively left to form a new club, FFV Leipzig.

Former players
  Babett Peter

References

Women
Defunct women's football clubs in Germany
Defunct football clubs in Saxony
Sport in Leipzig
Association football clubs established in 2003
Association football clubs disestablished in 2013
2003 establishments in Germany
2013 disestablishments in Germany
Frauen-Bundesliga clubs